Knabstrup is a small railway town, with a population of 1,052 (1 January 2022), at the railroad between Kalundborg and Holbæk in Holbæk Municipality, Region Zealand in Denmark.

Since 2008, the local environmental collective Makvärket has been working to convert  of the former factory into a center for ecological awareness.

References 

Cities and towns in Region Zealand
Holbæk Municipality